Fionn Patrick Edward Dunne   is a Professor of Materials Science at Imperial College London and holds the Chair in Micromechanics and the Royal Academy of Engineering/Rolls-Royce Research Chair. Professor Dunne specialises in computational crystal plasticity and microstructure-sensitive nucleation and growth of short fatigue cracks in engineering materials, mainly Nickel, Titanium and Zirconium alloys.

Early life and education 
Dunne completed a Bachelor of Science and Master of Engineering degree from the Department of Mechanical Engineering, University of Bristol by 1989, and moved to the Department of Mechanical and Process Engineering, University of Sheffield, for a Doctor of Philosophy in Computer Aided Modelling of Creep-cyclic Plasticity Interaction in Engineering Materials and Structures.

Research and career 
In 1994, Dunne was appointed as a Postdoctoral research associate in the Department of Mechanical Engineering, University of Manchester (UMIST), before being appointed a Research Fellowship at Hertford College, Oxford and the Department of Engineering Science, University of Oxford from 1996 until 2012 when he moved to Imperial College London. He is an Emeritus Fellow of Hertford College, Oxford.

While in Oxford, Dune was part of the Materials for fusion & fission power program. He led the Micro-mechanical modelling techniques for forming texture, non-proportionality and failure in auto materials program at the Department of Engineering Science, University of Oxford between October 2011 and June 2012, when he moved the grant with him to the Department of Materials, Imperial College London from June 2012 until it ended in March 2015.

He also led the Heterogeneous Mechanics in Hexagonal Alloys across Length and Time Scales (HexMat) program, which was Engineering and Physical Sciences Research Council (EPSRC) funded at a value of £5 million between May 2013 and November 2018. Dunne was the director of the Rolls-Royce Nuclear University Technology Centre at Imperial College London. He is part of a £7.2 million program on Mechanistic understanding of Irradiation Damage in fuel Assemblies (MIDAS) that is funded by Engineering and Physical Sciences Research Council until April 2024

As of November 2022, Dunne is a Professor of Materials Science at Imperial College London and holds the Chair in Micromechanics and the Royal Academy of Engineering (RAEng)/Rolls-Royce Research Chair. Hi is also a Rolls-Royce consultant , and an Honorary Professor and co-director of the Beijing International Aeronautical Materials (BIAM).

Dunne's research focuses on computational crystal plasticity, discrete dislocation plasticity, and microstructure-sensitive nucleation and growth of short fatigue cracks in engineering materials, mainly Nickel, Titanium, and Zirconium alloys.

Awards and honours 
In 2010, Dunne was elected a Fellow of the Royal Academy of Engineering (FREng). In 2016, he was awarded the Institute of Materials, Minerals and Mining (IoM3) Harvey Flower Titanium Prize. In 2017, Dunne's Engineering Alloys team shared the Imperial President's Award for Outstanding Research Team with Professor Chris Phillips’s team.

Selected publications

References 

Fellows of the Royal Academy of Engineering
Living people
Academics of Imperial College London
Fellows of the Institute of Materials, Minerals and Mining
Year of birth missing (living people)
Metallurgists